862 Franzia (prov. designation:  or ) is a stony background asteroid from the central regions of the asteroid belt. It was discovered by German astronomer Max Wolf at the Heidelberg-Königstuhl State Observatory on 28 January 1917. It was named after the discoverer's son, Franz Wolf.

Orbit and classification 

Franzia is a non-family asteroid of the main belt's background population when applying the hierarchical clustering method to its proper orbital elements. It orbits the Sun in the central asteroid belt at a distance of 2.6–3.0 AU once every 4 years and 8 months (1,715 days; semi-major axis of 2.8 AU). Its orbit has an eccentricity of 0.08 and an inclination of 14° with respect to the ecliptic.

Naming 

This minor planet was named in honor of Franz Wolf, son of the discoverer Max Wolf. The  was also mentioned in The Names of the Minor Planets by Paul Herget in 1955. It also honors the discoverer's father, Franz Wolf, a physician and amateur astronomer who fostered his son's interest in astronomy by setting up a small observatory in the backyard when Max was sixteen.

Physical characteristics 

In the Bus–Binzel SMASS classification, Franzia is a common, stony S-type asteroid.

Rotation period 

Over the last two decades, numerous photometric observations of Franzia have been proven challenging to determine a well defined rotation period. In August 2018, a rotational lightcurve was obtained from observations by Christophe Demeautis and Raoul Behrend. Lightcurve analysis gave a period of  hours with a brightness variation of  magnitude. This result supersedes previous observations.

Alternatively, Warner also gave a revised period of  hours and an amplitude of  magnitude for his other observation taken on December 2000.

In February 2011, James W. Brinsfield at the Via Capote Observatory  in California measured a period of  hours with an amplitude of  magnitude. Observations by Nicolas Esseiva and Raoul Behrend in December 2014 gave a tentative period of  hours and a weak amplitude of  magnitude. A basically identical period of  hours with a brightness variation of  magnitude was determined by French amateur astronomer René Roy in February 2011. In March 2016, the Spanish group of asteroid observers, OBAS, measures a period of  hours with an amplitude of  magnitude.

Diameter and albedo 

The Collaborative Asteroid Lightcurve Link derives an albedo of 0.2700 and a diameter of 28.05 kilometers based on an absolute magnitude of 9.8.

Notes

References

External links 
 Lightcurve Database Query (LCDB), at www.minorplanet.info
 Dictionary of Minor Planet Names, Google books
 Asteroids and comets rotation curves, CdR – Geneva Observatory, Raoul Behrend
 Discovery Circumstances: Numbered Minor Planets (1)-(5000) – Minor Planet Center
 
 

000862
Discoveries by Max Wolf
Named minor planets
000862
19170128